The Areopagus of Eastern Continental Greece was a provisional regime that existed in eastern Central Greece during the Greek War of Independence.

Background 
During the first stages of the Greek Revolution against the Ottoman Empire, there existed no overall authority over the rebels. Each region separately elected its own assemblies and tried to put together an administration to coordinate the struggle. One of the first such entities was established in eastern continental Greece ("Roumeli").

History 
The uprising began in March, and established itself with the capture of the provincial capital, Salona (modern Amfissa), on 27 March 1821. The Ottoman garrison held out in the citadel until April 10, when the Greeks took it. At the same time, the Greeks suffered a defeat at the Battle of Alamana against the army of Omer Vryonis, which resulted in the death of Athanasios Diakos. But the Ottoman advance was stopped at the inn of Gravia, under the leadership of Odysseas Androutsos, who was subsequently named commander-in-chief of Eastern Greece. Vryonis turned towards Boeotia and sacked Livadia, awaiting reinforcements before proceeding towards the Morea. These forces, 8,000 men under Beyran Pasha, were however met and defeated at the Battle of Vassilika, on August 26. This defeat forced Vryonis too to withdraw, securing both Eastern Greece and the Morea.

The Administration of Eastern Greece 

Vryonis' defeat paved the way for the political organization of the freed territories. In 15–20 November 1821, a council was held in Salona, where the main local notables and military chiefs participated. Under the direction of Theodoros Negris, they set down a proto-constitution for the region, the "Legal Order of Eastern Continental Greece" (Νομική Διάταξις της Ανατολικής Χέρσου Ελλάδος), and established a governing council, the Areopagus, composed of 71 notables from eastern Continental Greece as well as the regions of Thessaly and Macedonia, where the Greek uprisings would soon be suppressed.

Officially, the Areopagus was superseded by the central Provisional Administration, established in January 1822 after the First National Assembly, but the council continued its existence and exercised considerable authority, albeit in the name of the national government. However, the relationship was often tense, especially as Greece soon entered a phase of virtual civil war.

Members 
 Ioannis Filonos from Livadeia
 Vassilakis Kalkos from Livadeia
 Rigas Kontorigas from Salona 
 Panagiotis Kondilis from Lidoriki
 Neofytos Talantiou from Atalanti
 Georgios Ainian from Patratziki
 Konstantinos Sakelion from Agrafa
 Ioannis Skandalidis from Macedonia
 Anthimos Gazis from Thessaly
 Drosos Mansolas from Thessaly
 Theodoros Negris, President of the Areopagus, from Zitouni
 Panousis Sabontzis from Thebes
 Ioannis Eirinaios from Athens
 Konstantinos Chatziioannou from Chalkida

1825 disestablishments
Political institutions of the Greek War of Independence
States and territories established in 1821
Historical legislatures in Greece
1821 establishments in Greece
Central Greece in the Greek War of Independence